Lina Franzese is an Italian Paralympian.

She competed at the 1976 Summer Paralympics, winning a gold medal in 100 metres F1, and 1980 Summer Paralympics, winning a silver in 100 metres F1.

See also
Paralympic sports
Sport in Italy

References 

Paralympic athletes of Italy
Italian female sprinters
Athletes (track and field) at the 1976 Summer Paralympics
Athletes (track and field) at the 1980 Summer Paralympics
Medalists at the 1976 Summer Paralympics
Medalists at the 1980 Summer Paralympics
Paralympic medalists in athletics (track and field)
Paralympic gold medalists for Italy
Paralympic silver medalists for Italy
Date of birth missing (living people)
Place of birth missing (living people)